The 2009–10 Al-Hilal FC season was Al-Hilal Saudi Football Club's 53rd in existence and 34th consecutive season in the top flight of Saudi Arabian football. Along with Pro League, the club participated in the AFC Champions League, Crown Prince Cup, and the King Cup.

Players

Squad information

Competitions

Overall

Notes
Note 1: Al-Hilal qualified to the quarter-finals.

Overview

Pro League

League table

Results summary

Results by round

Matches

Crown Prince Cup

King Cup of Champions

Quarter-finals

Semi-finals

Final

2010 AFC Champions League

Group stage

Knockout stage

Round of 16

Statistics

Goalscorers

Assists

References

Al Hilal SFC seasons
Hilal